Solenny Bolivia Villasmil (born May 12, 1981) is a Venezuelan weightlifter. Villasmil represented Venezuela at the 2008 Summer Olympics in Beijing, where she competed for the women's middleweight category (63 kg). Villasmil placed thirteenth in this event, as she successfully lifted 90 kg in the single-motion snatch, and hoisted 115 kg in the two-part, shoulder-to-overhead clean and jerk, for a total of 205 kg.

References

External links
NBC 2008 Olympics profile

Venezuelan female weightlifters
1981 births
Living people
Olympic weightlifters of Venezuela
Weightlifters at the 2008 Summer Olympics
Pan American Games medalists in weightlifting
Pan American Games silver medalists for Venezuela
Weightlifters at the 2003 Pan American Games
21st-century Venezuelan women